USS Mattabesett, sometimes spelled Mattabeset, a schooner-rigged, wooden hulled, double-ended sidewheel gunboat, was built by A. & G. T. Sampson, Boston, Massachusetts, and named for the Mattabesset River in Connecticut. Mattabesett was delivered to the New York Navy Yard on January 18, 1864, and commissioned April 7, 1864, Commander John C. Febiger in command.

Service history
Continuing down the coast to enter the North Carolina Sounds, she took part in an engagement between Union forces and the Confederate ram CSS Albemarle, accompanied by CSS Bombshell and CSS Cotton Plant, off the mouth of the Roanoke River on May 5.

But for a brief trip to New York in the fall of 1864, Mattabesett continued to serve the North Atlantic Blockading Squadron for the remainder of the U.S. Civil War, operating primarily in the inland waters of North Carolina. She sailed north in May 1865, decommissioned at New York on May 31, and was sold there on October 15.

See also
Ships captured in the American Civil War

Footnotes

References
Bauer, Karl Jack and Roberts, Stephen S. (1991): Register of Ships of the U.S. Navy, 1775-1990: Major Combatants, Greenwood Publishing Group, .

External links
Photo gallery at Naval Historical Center

Ships built in Boston
Ships of the Union Navy
Massachusetts in the American Civil War
American Civil War patrol vessels of the United States
Sassacus-class gunboats
1864 ships